Glastonbury Festival is a greenfield music and performing arts festival on farm land near Pilton, England. It was first held in 1970 and has been held in the majority of years since then in the summer. Its line-up is diverse, including music, comedy, circus and theatre, taking place on many different stages and performance areas.

1970 
Line-up included:

Tyrannosaurus Rex
Amazing Blondel
Ian A. Anderson
Keith Christmas
Quintessence
Duster Bennett
Sam Apple Pie
Wayne Fontana
Stackridge
Steamhammer
Al Stewart
Planxty
Marsupilami 
Roy Harper

1971 
Line-up included:

Joan Baez
David Bowie
Edgar Broughton Band
Arthur Brown
Fairport Convention
Family
Gilberto Gil
Gong
Hawkwind
Help Yourself
Henry Cow
Magic Michael
Marsupilami 
Melanie
Mighty Baby
Pink Fairies
Quintessence
Terry Reid (w/ David Lindley and Linda Lewis)
Brinsley Schwarz
Traffic
The Worthy Farm Windfuckers (house band feat. Thomas Crimble, Johnny Hodge and 'English' John Fox)

Pink Floyd were scheduled but were unable to perform due to poor stage access for their set.

1978 
Known as the "impromptu festival".
Nik Turner's Sphynx
Nice n Easy
White Island
Pedro
Motivation
Tribe

1979 
Line-up included:
Tim Blake
Peter Gabriel w/ Phil Collins, Steve Hillage, Tom Robinson, Nona Hendryx and Alex Harvey
Alex Harvey Band
Steve Hillage
Mother Gong
Nik Turner's Sphynx
The Only Ones
Footsbarn Theatre
Sky
The Pop Group & The Slits
The Leyton Buzzards
John Martyn
The Atoms – opening act

1980 
No festival, but Hawkwind supported by Vardis performed in the barn on 6 November as part of their Levitation tour.

1981 
Line-up included:

Pyramid stage 

 Ronnie Lane's Slim Chance replaced Judie Tzuke who cancelled due to laryngitis.

1982 
Line-up included:

Aswad
Jackson Browne
Roy Harper
Van Morrison
Judie Tzuke
Randy California
The Blues Band
Richie Havens
Sad Café
Black Uhuru
The Chieftains
Funkapolitan
A Certain Ratio
John Cooper Clarke
Jean-Pierre Rampal and Didier Malherbe
Talisman
Osibisa
Climax Blues Band
Ekome
Steve Wally

1983 
Line-up included:

Pyramid stage 

Other acts that played included:

 Dennis Brown, w/ Aswad as backup band
 Alexis Korner
 Black Roots
 The Flying Pickets
 Tom Paxton

Julian Cope and James Brown were announced as playing but both withdrew in advance.

1984 
Line-up included:

Pyramid stage 

Amazulu were scheduled to be the opening act on the Pyramid Stage on the Saturday, but did not arrive in time. They were subsequently given a slot before General Public, necessitating The Smiths to take the stage earlier than scheduled.

Elvis Costello And The Attractions were not announced as Saturday's headliners until a few days before the festival started, and too late to be credited in the official programme.

Ian Dury was backed by his then current band, The Music Students.

1985 
Line-up included:

Pyramid stage

Other stage

1986 
Line-up included:

Pyramid stage

Stage Two

1987 
Line-up included:

Pyramid stage

Stage Two

1989 
Line-up included:

Pyramid stage 

Adam Clayton of U2 joined Hot House Flowers onstage to play on "Feet on the Ground".

Georgie Fame was Van Morrison's keyboard player and played "Yeh, Yeh" before Morrison arrived onstage.

Peter Gabriel joined Youssou N'Dour onstage for one or more songs.

There was speculation in the music press, prior to the festival, that Donovan's "friends" would include big names, such as Paul McCartney and Eric Clapton. The "friends" turned out to be Ozric Tentacles.

Elvis Costello's set was solo.

1990 
Line-up as listed in the official programme:

Pyramid stage 

Archaos performed on top of the Pyramid after the Friday and Saturday night sets.

1992 
Line-up included:

Pyramid stage

NME stage

Jazz stage

1993 
Line-up included:

Pyramid Stage

NME Stage

Jazz Stage

Acoustic Stage

1994 
Line-up included:

Pyramid Stage

NME Stage

Jazz Stage

Acoustic Stage

1995 
Line-up included:

Pyramid stage

NME stage 

also:

 The Chemical Brothers
 Massive Attack
 Tricky
 Plastikman
 Carl Cox
 Gil Scott-Heron (didn't show,  replaced by Spearhead)
 Mike Scott
 Portishead
 Transglobal Underground
 Al Stewart
 Steeleye Span
 Evan Dando (booed off)
 The Dolmen
 G Love and Special Sauce
 Autechre
 Eat Static

1997

Pyramid stage

Other stage 

Line-up also included:

 The Orb
 Roni Size
 Cheikh Lô & Youssou Ndour
 Daft Punk

1998

Main stage 
The headlining stage was not officially called the Pyramid Stage in 1998, as it did not have its distinctive pyramid shape.

Other stage

New stage

Jazzworld stage

Dance tent 

Lineup also included:

 Babybird
 Bernard Butler
 Julian Cope
 Rolf Harris
 Taj Mahal & The Phantom Blues Band
 Ozric Tentacles
 Eddi Reader
 Salsa Celtica
 Squeeze

1999

Pyramid stage 

(Björn Again moved up the bill to replace Ian Dury & The Blockheads, who cancelled their appearance due to illness)

Other stage 
Lineup also included:

Coldplay (New Tent)
 Doves (New Tent)
 David Gray (New Tent)
 Merz (New Tent)

2000

Pyramid stage

Other stage

2002

Pyramid stage

Other stage 

Line-up also included:

 Spearhead

2003

Pyramid stage

Other stage 

Line-up also included:

 Yes
 The Streets
 The Delgados
 Bill Bailey (Cabaret Tent)
 Ross Noble (Cabaret Tent)

2004

2004 Pyramid stage

2004 Other stage

2004 Dance tent

2004 New tent

2004 Jazzworld stage

2004 Acoustic stage

2004 Avalon stage

2004 The Glade

2005

Pyramid stage

Other stage

John Peel stage

Jazzworld stage

Acoustic stage

Dance village

Avalon stage

Left field 
Friday: British Sea Power, Sonic Audio, Buck 65, The Rakes

Saturday: Babyshambles, Estelle, The Others Agent Blue

Sunday: Billy Bragg, Steve Earle, Retrospect

Poetry & words 

 Jah Biggz
 Bonnie Brookes
 Brendan the Pop Poet
 Penny Broadhurst
 Rosie Carrick
 Carol Ann Duffy
 Pete Eldridge
 Giovanni Esposito
 Nathan Filer
 Helen Gregory
 Yasmine Haideman
 Will Hames
 Love Fairies
 Gilly the Nun
 Anna Lindup
 Malign Interlect
 Harry Man
 Paul Marshall
 Annie McGann
 Elvis McGonagall
 Kate Noakes
 Rachel Pantechnicon
 Phaze
 Polar Bear Ninja
 Pat VT West
 Leeanne Stoddart
 Eliana Tomkins
 Kimberley Trusty
 Tony Walsh
 James Windsor
 Yam Boy and Mango

2007

Pyramid stage

Other stage

John Peel stage

Jazzworld stage

Acoustic stage

Dance village

Avalon stage

Orange Tent

2008 
The festival took place on 27–29 June.

Pyramid Stage

Other Stage

Park Stage

John Peel stage

Acoustic stage

Jazzworld Stage

Avalon Stage

Poetry&Words Stage

Avalon Cafe Stage

Late n Live Stage

2009 

The festival took place on 26–28 June.

Pyramid Stage

Other Stage

Park Stage

John Peel stage

Acoustic stage

Jazzworld Stage

Avalon Stage

2010 

The festival took place on 25–27 June.

Pyramid Stage

Other Stage

John Peel Stage

2011 

The festival took place on 24 to 26 June.

Pyramid Stage

Other Stage

Park Stage

John Peel stage

West Holts Stage

BBC Introducing stage

Spirit of '71 stage (Anniversary Pyramid Stage)  
Curated by Andrew Kerr

2012 
There was no Glastonbury Festival in 2012, with the organizers having planned it as a "fallow year", due to the 2012 Summer Olympics and Paralympics in London.

2013 
The festival took place on 24–28 June.

Pyramid Stage 

(Jupiter & Okwess International replaced Toumani Diabaté who cancelled due to malaria)

Other Stage

John Peel Stage

2014 
The festival took place from the 27 to 29 June.

Pyramid Stage

Other Stage

John Peel Stage

2015 
The 2015 Glastonbury Festival of Contemporary Performing Arts took place between 24 and 28 June.

The following acts were announced to perform.

Pyramid Stage

Other Stage

John Peel Stage

West Holts

The Park Stage

2016 
The 2016 Glastonbury Festival of Contemporary Performing Arts took place between 22 and 26 June 2016.

The line-up was as follows:

Pyramid Stage

Other Stage

West Holts Stage

John Peel Stage

The Park Stage

2017 
The 2017 Glastonbury Festival of Contemporary Performing Arts took place between 21 and 25 June 2017.

The line-up was as follows:

Pyramid Stage

Other Stage

West Holts Stage

John Peel Stage

The Park Stage

2019 
The 2019 Glastonbury Festival of Contemporary Performing Arts took place between 26 and 30 June 2019.

The line-up was as follows:

Pyramid Stage 

A Stormzy's set featured appearances by Chris Martin, Dave and Fredo.

B. Bastille's set featured an appearance by Lewis Capaldi.

C. The Killers' set featured appearances by Pet Shop Boys and Johnny Marr.

D. Kylie Minogue's set featured appearances by Nick Cave and Chris Martin.

E. Miley Cyrus' set featured appearances by Mark Ronson, Billy Ray Cyrus and Lil Nas X.

Other Stage

West Holts Stage

John Peel Stage

The Park Stage

2020 
The 2020 Glastonbury Festival was to take place between 24 and 28 June 2020. The first wave of performers for the festival were announced on lineup was announced on 12 March. However, the festival was cancelled  on 18 March 2020 due to the COVID-19 pandemic.

The following artists had been announced as part of the 2020 Glastonbury lineup prior the event's cancellation:

 Kendrick Lamar
 Paul McCartney
 Taylor Swift
 Diana Ross
 Aitch
 AJ Tracey
 Anderson Paak and The Free Nationals
 Angel Olsen
 Anna Calvi
 The Avalanches
 Banks
 Baxter Dury
 beabadoobee
 The Big Moon
 Big Thief
 Big Time Rush
 Black Uhuru
 Blossoms
 Brittany Howard
 Burna Boy
 Cage the Elephant
 Camila Cabello
 Candi Staton

 Caribou
 Cate Le Bon
 Celeste
 Charli XCX
 Clairo
 Confidence Man
 Crowded House
 Danny Brown
 Declan McKenna
 Dizzee Rascal
 Dua Lipa
 EarthGang
 EOB
 Editors
 Elbow
 Fatboy Slim
 FKA Twigs
 Fontaines D.C.
 Gilberto Gil
 Glass Animals
 Goldfrapp
 Greentea Peng
 Groove Armada
 HAIM

 Happy Mondays
 Herbie Hancock
 Imelda May
 The Isley Brothers
 Jarvis Cocker
 Jehnny Beth
 The Jesus and Mary Chain
 Kacey Musgraves
 Kano
 Kelis
 Khruangbin
 KOKOKO!
 La Roux
 Lana Del Rey
 Laura Marling
 Lianne La Havas
 The Lightning Seeds
 London Grammar
 Mabel
 Manic Street Preachers
 Metronomy
 Nadine Shah
 Noel Gallagher's High Flying Birds
 Nubya Garcia

 The Orielles
 Pet Shop Boys
 Phoebe Bridgers
 Primal Scream
 Richard Dawson
 Rufus Wainwright
 Sam Fender
 Sampa the Great
 Seun Kuti
 Sinéad O'Connor
 Skunk Anansie
 Snarky Puppy
 Soccer Mommy
 The Specials
 Squid
 The Staves
 Supergrass
 Suzanne Vega
 Thom Yorke
 Thundercat
 Tinariwen
 TLC
 Tom Misch and Yussef Dayes
 Tones and I
 The Waterboys

2021
The 2021 Glastonbury Festival was scheduled for June 23 through June 27 but was cancelled in late January due to the COVID-19 pandemic for the second year in a row. In its place, a shortened, live-streamed concert, Live at Worthy Farm, was held on May 22 followed by an encore on May 23. The live-stream was held on the grounds where Glastonbury typically takes place.

The broadcast included:

 Coldplay
 Damon Albarn
 George Ezra
 HAIM
 Idles
 Jorja Smith
 Kano
 Michael Kiwanuka
 Wolf Alice
 DJ Honey Dijon
 PJ Harvey
 Jarvis Cocker
 Kae Tempest
 George the Poet
 Kurupt FM
 Little Amal
 Michael Eavis
 Róisín Murphy

They also held the Glastonbury Experience between June 25 and June 27 and played highlights of past festivals; it was accessible via BBC iPlayer and on BBC Two and BBC Four. Performances shown included:
 Glastonbury in the 90s, narrated by Skin from Skunk Anansie
 Radiohead (1997)
 R.E.M. (1999)
 Glastonbury in the 21st Century – performances since 2000
 Kylie Minogue (2019)
 Arctic Monkeys (2013)
 Glastonbury Legends – including Paul McCartney, Paul Simon, Kylie Minogue, and Madness
 Live at Worthy Farm: Backstage – narrated by Jo Whiley
 Live at Worthy Farm – highlights from the 2021 live-stream including Coldplay, HAIM, and Damon Albarn
 Al Green (1999)
 Best of Glastonbury 1998 – including Primal Scream, James, Foo Fighters, The Lightning Seeds, Blur, Robbie Williams
 Best of Glastonbury 1999 – including R.E.M., The Beautiful South, Blondie, and Barenaked Ladies
 Best of Glastonbury 2003 – including Manic Street Preachers, R.E.M., Radiohead, Macy Gray, and the Sugababes
 Iggy Pop and The Stooges (2007)
 Glastonbury 2017 – including Radiohead, Foo Fighters, and Ed Sheeran; hosted by Jo Whiley and Mark Radcliffe
 Fela Kuti (1984)

BBC Radio 1 , BBC Radio 2, BBC Radio 1Xtra, and others played show highlights; hosts included Future Sounds, Festival Anthems, Jordan North, DJ Target, Tiffany Calver, Bobby Friction, Sounds of the 90s, Jo Whiley, Lauren Laverne, The Blessed Madonna, Cerys Matthews, Zoe Ball, and Dermot O'Leary.

2022
In August 2021, Michael Eavis shared that the same bands from the 2020 lineup should be present at the 2022 festival.

The 2022 Glastonbury Festival of Contemporary Performing Arts took place between 22 and 26 June 2022.

The line-up was as follows:

Pyramid Stage

Other Stage

West Holts Stage

John Peel Stage

The Park Stage

2023 
On December 2, Glastonbury announced that Elton John will headline the Pyramid Stage on the Sunday of the 2023 edition of the festival.

On March 3, 2023, the first poster for the festival was released featuring the following acts alongside Elton John;

Arctic Monkeys,
Guns N’ Roses,
Lizzo,
Aitch,
Alison Goldfrapp,
Alt-J,
Amadou & Mariam,
Becky Hill,
Blondie,
Candi Staton,
Carly Rae Jepsen,
Cat Burns,
Central Cee,
Christine And The Queens,
Chvrches,
Ezra Collective,
Fatboy Slim,
Fever Ray,
Flo,
Fred Again..,
Hot Chip,
Joey Bada$$,
Kelis,
Lana Del Rey,
Leftfield,
Lewis Capaldi,
Lil Nas X,
Loyle Carner,
Maggie Rogers,
Mahalia,
Måneskin,
Manic Street Preachers,
Nova Twins,
Phoenix,
Raye,
Rina Sawayama,
Royal Blood,
Rudimental,
Shygirl,
Slowthai,
Sparks,
Stefflon Don,
Sudan Archives,
Texas,
The Chicks,
The War On Drugs,
Thundercat,
Tinariwen,
Warpaint,
Weyes Blood,
Wizkid,
Young Fathers and
Yusuf / Cat Stevens.

References

External links
 Glastonbury 2008 preview at UKEvents.net
 eFestivals.com Glastonbury 2008 lineup rumours
 The Archive: a history of UK rock festivals

Glastonbury Festival